Nik Bärtsch's Ronin Live is a live album by Swiss pianist, record producer and author. Nik Bärtsch's band Ronin recorded in Europe and Japan between 2009 and 2011 and released on the ECM label.

Reception

The PopMatters review by John Garratt stated "It’s actually somewhat of a marvel that music this nuanced can be so warm and inviting. It’s also a pleasant surprise that the overall quality of the music holds up for two-plus years of live performances". Carlo Wolff of JazzTimes observed "There are moments of peace, of near-stasis. But over the course of these long discs, there’s no sag. Expertly sequenced, they unfold like a single concert". On All About Jazz John Kelman enthused "Ronin is an exciting and hypnotic live act, with Live demonstrating the full breadth of its intrinsic possibilities". BBC Music's Sid Smith called it "A hair-raising and dazzling celebration of Ronin’s considerable achievements to date".

Track listing
All compositions by Nik Bärtsch.

Disc one
 "Modul 41_17" – 16:38   
 "Modul 35" – 11:31   
 "Modul 42" – 9:09   
 "Modul 17" – 9:58   
 "Modul 22" – 14:45

Disc two
 "Modul 45" – 13:11   
 "Modul 48" – 8:37   
 "Modul 47" – 13:11   
 "Modul 55" – 10:00

Recorded in Lörrach (1–1), Leipzig (1–2), Wien (1–3), Tokyo (1–4), Amsterdam (1–5), Mannheim (2-1, 2–3), Gateshead (2–2) and Salzau (2–4)

Personnel
 Nik Bärtsch — piano, electric piano
 Sha – alto saxophone, bass clarinet, contrabass clarinet
 Thomy Jordi (track 9) bass, Björn Meyer (all others) — bass 
 Kaspar Rast – drums 
 Andi Pupato – percussion

References

2012 live albums
Nik Bärtsch live albums
ECM Records live albums
Albums produced by Manfred Eicher